Sudylkiv (Ukrainian: Судилків)  is a village in  Shepetivka Raion in Khmelnytskyi Oblast in Ukraine. It hosts the administration of Sudylkiv rural hromada, one of the hromadas of Ukraine.

History
The 1897 census reveals that out of a total population of 5,551 there were 2,712 Jews. 
On August 20th, 1941 the 45th reserve police battalion killed 471 Jews in a nearby forest.
Today, the formerly important Jewish community is nonexistent due to the Holocaust and emigration.

Notable people
 Moshe Chaim Ephraim of Sudilkov, prominent rabbi from the town.
 Rebecca Spielberg, US film director Steven Spielberg's grandmother.
 from 1865 to 1872 in Sudylkiv spent his childhood Ignacy Jan Paderewski, a Polish pianist and composer who became a spokesman for Polish independence. In 1919, he was the new nation's Prime Minister and foreign minister during which he signed the Treaty of Versailles, which ended World War I.

References

Holocaust locations in Poland
Villages in Sheptivka Raion